Richard Rodriguez (born 10 December 1969) is a former Aruban long-distance runner who competed in the 2000 Summer Olympics, running in the marathon competition. He did not finish.

References

1969 births
Living people
Aruban male long-distance runners
Athletes (track and field) at the 2000 Summer Olympics
Olympic athletes of Aruba
World Athletics Championships athletes for Aruba